REScoop.eu is the European federation of renewable energy cooperatives, founded in 2011.

 it has 20 member organisations (either individual REScoops or regional REScoop federations) in 11 European Member States, representing 1,240 individual REScoops and their 300,000 citizens.

Its routine administration is handled by the Belgian cooperative Ecopower.

On December 24, 2013, the European federation of groups and cooperatives of citizens for renewable energy (REScoop.EU) was legally established under Belgian national law with a European scope. This legal act is a key issue to further develop the activities of the European federation and it constitutes the base to build a strong European renewable energy cooperative alliance.

REScoop is a short term for Renewable Energy Source Cooperative.

Positions and campaigns
REScoop.eu advocates for a decentralized, renewable, efficient, clean and sustainable energy system with citizens at its core, referring to the energy transition as “the energy transition to energy democracy”.

References

External links

International renewable energy organizations
Environmental organizations based in Europe